Finalmente libero! (i. e. "Finally free!") is a 1953 Italian comedy film written and directed by Mario Amendola and Ruggero Maccari and starring Carlo Dapporto and  Nadia Gray.

Plot

Cast 
 
 Carlo Dapporto as  Enrico Rossi 
 Nadia Gray as  Carla 
 Alba Arnova as  Simona
 Fulvia Franco as  Giuditta 
 Luisa Rossi as  Silvana 
 Marisa Merlini 
 Giacomo Rondinella  
 Irene Genna as  Concetta 
 Adriana Facchetti as  Margherita 
 Guglielmo Inglese  
 Enrico Glori 
 Ciccio Barbi  
 Alberto Sorrentino  
 Nino Marchesini

References

External links

1953 films
Italian comedy films
1953 comedy films
Films directed by Mario Amendola
1950s Italian-language films
Italian black-and-white films
1950s Italian films